Benjamin Clément (born 10 December 1966) is a French former professional footballer who played as a striker. He was part of AS Monaco FC squad at the 1992 UEFA Cup Winners' Cup Final.

References
 
 Profile
 Profile
 Profile

1966 births
Living people
French footballers
Association football forwards
Ligue 1 players
Ligue 2 players
Red Star F.C. players
AS Monaco FC players
FC Sochaux-Montbéliard players
Stade Lavallois players
S.S.D. Sanremese Calcio players
French expatriate footballers
French expatriate sportspeople in Italy
Expatriate footballers in Italy